Durham-Sud, also known as South Durham, is a small farming community in the Eastern Townships of Quebec, west of Richmond and south of Drummondville. The population as of the Canada 2011 Census was 1,008.

History
Early settlers of the area were Scottish and Irish immigrants who arrived mostly in the 18th and 19th century and found the area to be good for farming. Today, the community is predominantly francophone.

Éphrem-A. Brisebois was born here in 1850.

Demographics

Population
Population trend:

Language
Mother tongue (2011)

Notable people 

 Éphrem-A. Brisebois (1850–1890), politician, soldier, and law enforcement officer
 Jean-Paul LeBlanc (born 1946), retired ice hockey forward

See also
List of municipalities in Quebec

References

External links
 
 Official Website

Municipalities in Quebec
Incorporated places in Centre-du-Québec